The Little River is a tributary of the Red River, with a total length of ,  within the Choctaw Indian Reservation in southeastern Oklahoma and  in southwestern Arkansas in the United States. Via the Red, it is part of the watershed of the Mississippi River. Six large reservoirs impound the Little River and its tributaries. The Little River and its upper tributaries are popular for recreational canoeing and kayaking.

Course
It initially flows westward into Pushmataha County, then south into McCurtain County where it turns to flow southeast, past Wright City and through the Little River National Wildlife Refuge and a portion of the Ouachita National Forest, into Arkansas, where it flows through or along the boundaries of Sevier, Little River and Hempstead counties, past the Pond Creek National Wildlife Refuge.

Principal tributaries of the Little River in Oklahoma include the Glover River and the Mountain Fork, both of which join it in McCurtain County.  In Arkansas, it receives the Rolling Fork and the Cossatot River from the north in Sevier County; and the Saline River, which flows to Millwood Lake from the north on the boundary of Sevier and Howard counties.

Dams of the U.S. Army Corps of Engineers on the Little River create Pine Creek Lake  in Oklahoma and Millwood Lake  in Arkansas.  Dams on tributaries create Broken Bow Lake  in Oklahoma and DeQueen Lake, ; Gillham Lake, ; and Dierks Lake, in Arkansas.

Despite its modest length, the Little River is the sixth largest river in Oklahoma in terms of its flow which averages 3,275 cubic feet per second near the border with Arkansas.
There are no cities or towns on the Little River. Idabel, Oklahoma and DeQueen, Arkansas are near the river.

Recreation and conservation

The Little River and its major tributaries are popular for canoeing and kayaking.  The upper Little River from the hamlet of Honobia, Oklahoma to Pine Creek Lake, 46 river miles, has a moderate gradient and Class I and II rapids.  At Pine Creek Lake the river issues from the highlands and thereafter flows through a low, swampy floodplain.  The upper river may have insufficient water for boating from July to September except after rains.  Water quality of the Little River is usually excellent with little residential or commercial development along its banks.

The Honobia Creek Wildlife Management Area (WMA) of  includes much of the upper course of the Little River within its boundaries.  The WMA is a partnership between the government of Oklahoma and three timber companies.  Most of the land is used for plantations of Loblolly Pine but hardwood forest is preserved in some areas. Twenty-one miles of the river flows through the WMA. Sport fishes include Flathead catfish, Largemouth and Smallmouth bass, Green sunfish, and Chain Pickerel. A fee is charged to access the WMA.

The Little River National Wildlife Refuge in Oklahoma and the Pond Creek National Wildlife Refuge in Arkansas protect portions of the lower Little River and provide habitat for a large variety of animals and plants.  The  Little River NWR has the largest tree in Oklahoma, a Bald Cypress, within its boundaries and the largest specimens in Oklahoma of ten other tree species. Pond Creek NWR includes  on the north bank of the Little River.  Breeding populations of the American alligator are found in Millood Lake and Pond Creek NWR and alligators are sometimes seen in the Little River National Wildlife Refuge.  This lower section of the river is characterized by swamps, sloughs, oxbow lakes and a seasonally-flooded bottomland hardwood forest.

See also
List of Arkansas rivers
List of Oklahoma rivers
Little River National Wildlife Refuge
Pond Creek National Wildlife Refuge
Pine Creek Lake
Millwood Lake

References

External links

Little River National Wildlife Refuge website
Millwood Lake website
Pine Creek Lake website
Pond Creek National Wildlife Refuge website

Rivers of Arkansas
Rivers of Oklahoma
Bodies of water of Hempstead County, Arkansas
Bodies of water of Le Flore County, Oklahoma
Bodies of water of Little River County, Arkansas
Bodies of water of McCurtain County, Oklahoma
Bodies of water of Pushmataha County, Oklahoma
Bodies of water of Sevier County, Arkansas
Tributaries of the Red River of the South